Royal Air Force Dronehill or more simply RAF Dronehill is a former Royal Air Force station, a "G Chain Radar" site on Coldingham Moor, Scottish Borders, Scotland.

The site is currently being used as an caravan park and grassland.

References

Dronehill